Christ the Lord: The Road to Cana is a novel depicting the life of Jesus, written by Anne Rice and released in 2008. It is the sequel to Christ the Lord: Out of Egypt, and was part of a proposed four-part series about the life of Jesus.

Reviews
Publishers Weekly called the novel "beautifully observed ...  culmination of an intimate family saga of love, sorrow and misunderstanding". In dealing with the issues of Jesus's early childhood, the reviewer said that "Rice undertakes a delicate balance: if it is possible to create a character that is simultaneously fully human and fully divine, as ancient Christian creeds assert, then Rice succeeds."

References

Novelistic portrayals of Jesus
Novels by Anne Rice
American Christian novels
2008 American novels
Catholic novels
Sequel novels
Anchor Books books